Marvin E. Newman (born December 5, 1927) is an American artist and photographer.

Early life and education
At age 16, Newman entered Brooklyn College where he studied sculpture and photography with Walter Rosenblum. In 1948, Newman briefly joined the Photo League where he took classes with John Ebstel.

In 1949, he moved to Chicago to study at the Institute of Design with Harry Callahan and Aaron Siskind. After obtaining an MS degree in photography in 1952, Newman moved back to New York City.

Career
Newman has contributed to various publications including Sports Illustrated, Life, Look, Newsweek and Smithsonian.

Newman has authored or coauthored eight (8) books on the subject of photography. Newman received a Gold Medal for Editorial Photography from the New York Art Directors Club and the Lucie Award for his sports photography in 2009. He was at one time the national president of the American Society of Magazine Photographers.

Newman currently lives and works in New York City.

Chronology
2010    "Beyond COLOR." Participant, group show. Bruce Silverstein Gallery, New York, NY.
2010     "Discoveries." Participant, group show. Bruce Silverstein Gallery, New York, NY.
2010     "Passing the Torch:: The Chicago Students of Callahan and Siskin." Participant, vintage photography show. Stephen Daiter Gallery, Chicago, IL.
2009     Lucie Award for Achievement in Sports Photography. "Marvin E. Newman and Yasuhiro Ishimoto" Stephen Daiter Gallery, Chicago, IL.
2008	"Marvin E. Newman: The Color Series." Bruce Silverstein Gallery, New York, NY.
2006	"Marvin E. Newman: The First Decade." Bruce Silverstein Gallery, New York, NY.
2000	One man show, "Marvin E. Newman, Seven Photo Essays" Keith de Lellis Gallery, New York.
2000	"American Photographs 1900/2000" Assouline Publishers; two published 	photographs
1999	"Newman and Ishimoto, Reunion in Chicago: Photographs from 1949-1952". Two man show at Stephen Daiter Gallery, Chicago, Illinois.
1998 	"New acquisitions Exhibition". Metropolitan Museum of Art, New York.
1997	One man show, "Shadows 1951". B/W photography. Keith de Lellis Gallery, New York.
1996	"Chicago Photography 1935-1965". Major contributor. James Danziger Gallery, New York.
1995   	"Institute of Design".  Contributor, photography show. Museum of Contemporary Photography, Chicago, Illinois.
1995	"New York Stories". Major contributor, photography show. James Danziger 	Gallery, New York.
1994	"Hallmark Collection". Book and Exhibition.The Art Institute of Chicago. I C P Midtown, New York.
1992	"Paris, France". One year residence, color photography  for The Image Bank, subsidiary of Eastman Kodak
1989	"Life through the Sixties". Participant, photo exhibit. International Center of 	Photography, New York.	
1988	"The Image Bank". Worldwide Picture agency. Contract photographer.
1987	"Christie's Inc.", Fine Art Auctioneers. National advertising photography.
1986	"Statue of Liberty,100 Years". Time Magazine, photographic color supplement.
1985	"42nd Street at Night". Popular Photography, June issue. Photographic color 	portfolio.
1984	"New York at Night". Stewart Tabori and Chang publishers. Full color portfolio of Times Square in the 1950s.
1983	"American Society of Magazine Photographers", President. Led cultural delegation to China as a guest of the Chinese government.
1982	"Manhattan". Participant, color photographic show. The Museum of the City of New York.
1982	"J.P. Morgan Bank". 1982-1987. National advertising photography.
1981	"Breaking Ground, Open Spaces Temporary and Accidental". Photographs by Marvin E. Newman, text by Brendan Gill. One man show. Municipal Art Society of New York.

Permanent collections

 International Center of Photography, New York
 Art Institute of Chicago
 The Columbus Museum, Ohio
 The National Gallery, Washington, DC
 Eastman House Museum, Rochester
 The Hallmark Collection, Kansas City
 The Houston Museum, Texas
 The Jewish Museum, New York
 The Metropolitan Museum of Art, New York
 The Museum of Modern Art, New York
 The Whitney Museum, New York

References

External links
Lucie Foundation

1927 births
American photographers
Possibly living people
Photographers from the Bronx
Artists from the Bronx
Brooklyn College alumni